Sir William Villiers, 3rd Baronet (9 January 1645 – 27 February 1712) was an English politician from the Villiers family.

He was the only son of Sir George Villiers, 2nd Baronet and his wife Penelope Denham, daughter of Sir John Denham. In 1682, he succeeded his father as baronet. Villiers was a Member of Parliament (MP) for Leicester in the Parliament of England from 1698 until 1701. He lived at the family seat, Brooksby Hall, Leicestershire.

Villiers married Anne Potts, daughter of Charles Potts. Their marriage was childless and with his death the baronetcy became extinct and Brooksby Hall was sold.

References

1645 births
1712 deaths
Baronets in the Baronetage of England
English MPs 1698–1700
English MPs 1701
William Villiers, 3rd Baronet